Whiting is a town in Addison County, Vermont, United States. The town was named for John Whiting, a landholder. The population was 405 at the 2020 census.

Geography
Whiting is located in southern Addison County, in the southern reaches of the Champlain Valley. It is bordered by the town of Orwell to the southwest, Shoreham to the west, Cornwall to the north, and Salisbury and Leicester to the east. To the south is Rutland County, with the town of Sudbury to the south and Brandon to the southeast. Otter Creek forms most of the eastern border of Whiting.

Demographics

As of the census of 2000, there were 380 people, 155 households, and 101 families residing in the town.  The population density was 27.8 people per square mile (10.7/km2).  There were 167 housing units at an average density of 12.2 per square mile (4.7/km2).  The racial makeup of the town was 97.37% White, 0.26% African American, 0.26% Asian, 0.79% from other races, and 1.32% from two or more races. Hispanic or Latino of any race were 0.79% of the population.

There were 155 households, out of which 31.0% had children under the age of 18 living with them, 52.9% were married couples living together, 5.8% had a female householder with no husband present, and 34.8% were non-families. 24.5% of all households were made up of individuals, and 9.7% had someone living alone who was 65 years of age or older.  The average household size was 2.45 and the average family size was 2.96.

In the town, the age distribution of the population shows 23.4% under the age of 18, 7.9% from 18 to 24, 31.6% from 25 to 44, 24.7% from 45 to 64, and 12.4% who were 65 years of age or older.  The median age was 39 years. For every 100 females, there were 104.3 males.  For every 100 females age 18 and over, there were 104.9 males.

The median income for a household in the town was $31,985, and the median income for a family was $41,250. Males had a median income of $26,250 versus $26,563 for females. The per capita income for the town was $20,101.  About 3.8% of families and 4.7% of the population were below the poverty line, including 4.9% of those under age 18 and 9.8% of those age 65 or over.

Notable people 

 Asher P. Nichols, lawyer and politician
 Philetus Sawyer, US congressman and senator from Wisconsin
 Lucy Hall Washington, poet, social reformer
 Jarvis White, Wisconsin State Assemblyman

References

External links
 https://whitingvt.com/ Town of Whiting official website]

 
Towns in Vermont
Towns in Addison County, Vermont